Rural View is a suburb in the Mackay Region, Queensland, Australia.

Geography 

History 
Eimeo Road State School opened on 5 February 1934.

Rural View was officially named and bounded in September 1999.

Mackay Northern Beaches State High School opened on 1 January 2013.

St Brendan's Catholic Primary School opened in 2015.

Education 
Eimeo Road State School is a government primary (Prep-6) school for boys and girls at 21 Eimeo Road. In 2014, the student enrolment was 942 with 61 teachers (52 full-time equivalent). In 2018, the school had an enrolment of 980 students with 72 teachers (66 full-time equivalent) and 35 non-teaching staff (23 full-time equivalent). It includes a special education program.

St Brendan's Catholic Primary School is a private primary (Prep-6) school at 799 Mackay-Bucasia Road.

Mackay Northern Beaches State High School is a government secondary (7-12) school for boys and girls at 30 Rosewood Drive. In 2014, the student enrolment was 390 with 37 teachers (35 equivalent full-time). In 2018, the school had an enrolment of 930 students with 74 teachers (71 full-time equivalent) and 43 non-teaching staff (31 full-time equivalent). It includes a special education program.

References

External links
 

Suburbs of Mackay, Queensland
1999 establishments in Australia
Populated places established in 1999